Giovanni Francesco Surchi (died c. 1590) was an Italian painter of the late-Renaissance period, active in Ferrara.

Biography
He was also called il Dielai or il Dialai, his father's nickname which derives from the Venetian exclamation of Dio l'ajuti or God help us. Giovanni Francesco, the son of Zanobio, who was a pupil of Dosso Dossi. Orlandi found him facile with figures and grotteschi, and having a predilection for bizarre decoration.

He painted a Nativity at San Giovannino and the convent of the Benedictines in Ferrara. He painted the portrait of Ippolito Riminaldi. He painted frescoes for the Oratorio dell'Annunziata. He painted some medallions with the four evangelists for the church of the Gesu (Jesuits) in Ferrara. This was completed with the help of his pupil, il Bastarolo.

References

External links
    
Dosso Dossi: Court Painter in Renaissance Ferrara, a full text exhibition catalog from The Metropolitan Museum of Art

16th-century Italian painters
Italian male painters
Italian Renaissance painters
Painters from Ferrara
1590s deaths
Year of birth unknown
Fresco painters